Sheffy Bleier (Hebrew: שפי בלייר) is an Israeli photographer and educator.

Biography 
Sheffy Bleier is an israeli photographer and visual artist, mostly known for her provocative still life images primarily made of animal parts. Some of her works also research human relationships and motherhood, for example, the series "What remains" in which she exhibited images of still life objects, related to her son Jonathan early years. Bleier was born and raised in Tel Aviv where she continues to work. In addition to being an artist, she is also an educator, teaching in HaMidrasha School of Art, Beit Berl College from 2001.

Bleiers works are in permanent collections of The Israel Museum in Jerusalem, Haifa Museum of Art, The Museum of Israeli Art in Ramat Gan and
The Open Museum of Photography in Tel-Hai.

Exhibitions 
In recent years she has exhibited her works at many solo and group shows around the world and in Israel.

Solo 
1995 "Photographs 1994," Limbus Gallery, Tel Aviv
1997 "My Mother and Father, My Brother, My Sister, My Little Sister, Me, My Husband, and My Son..." The Museum of Israeli Art, Ramat Gan
1999 "Bras, Pillows, and Used Condoms (Emotional Substitutes)," Limbus Gallery, Tel Aviv
2000 "Fooling Saucer" Haifa Museum of Art
2005 "My Mother and Father, My Brother, My Sister, My Little Sister, Me and My Son...", Herzliya Museum of Contemporary Art
2009-2010 "Body of Love", Open Museum of Photography, Tel-Hai

Group 
"Meat After Meat Joy", Daneyal Mahmood Gallery, New York, 2008
"Cabinet of curiosities". Herzliya Museum of Contemporary Art, 2012

Awards 
1989 Sharet Scholarship Program, America-Israel Cultural Foundation
1997 Creativity Encouragement Prize for the Visual Arts, Department of Visual Art, The Council of Culture and Arts, Israeli Ministry of Education and Culture
2009 The Yehoshua Rabinovich Foundation for the Arts
2010 The Israel Lottery Council for The Arts Prize

References

External links 
Sheffy Bleier
Sheffy Bleier in Herzliya Museum of Contemporary Art

Israeli photographers
Israeli women photographers
Tel Aviv University alumni
People from Tel Aviv
1964 births
Living people
Open University of Israel alumni
Israeli educators
Israeli women educators